The following is a list of NCAA women's collegiate ice hockey teams, and conferences they compete in, that compete for berths in the annual NCAA Women's Ice Hockey Tournament. The championship has existed since the 2000–2001 season and conferences include the university teams of Divisions I and II of the NCAA.

Hockey East Association (HEA) 
Hockey East (full name: Hockey East Association) is a college athletic conference which operates primarily in New England, and features men's and women's competition. While the men's side of the conference temporarily added Notre Dame, located in Indiana, from 2013-2017, the women's side has remained a New England-only organization. It has emerged as one of the top women’s ice hockey conferences in United States. Hockey East continues to send teams to the Frozen Four (the NCAA Tournament).  

Boston College Eagles women's ice hockey
Boston University Terriers women's ice hockey
Connecticut Huskies women's ice hockey
Holy Cross Crusaders women's ice hockey
Maine Black Bears women's ice hockey
Merrimack Warriors women's ice hockey
New Hampshire Wildcats women's ice hockey
Northeastern Huskies women's ice hockey
Providence Friars women's ice hockey
Vermont Catamounts women's ice hockey

College Hockey America (CHA) 
College Hockey America (CHA) is a women’s college ice hockey conference (it participates in the NCAA’s Division I as a hockey-only conference). The conference began as a men's hockey conference in 1999, and added women's competition in 2002. After several of its member schools dropped the sport or moved to other conferences, the men's side of CHA folded after the 2009–10 season. CHA remains in operation as a women-only conference, currently with five teams — two each from New York state and Pennsylvania, plus one from Missouri.

Lindenwood Lady Lions ice hockey (joined 2012)
Mercyhurst Lakers women's ice hockey (original member from 2002)
Penn State Nittany Lions women's ice hockey (joined 2012)
Robert Morris Colonials women's ice hockey (joined in 2005, left in 2021, returning in 2023)
RIT Tigers women's ice hockey (joined 2012)
Syracuse Orange women's ice hockey (Joined 2008)

The CHA conference champion currently receives an automatic bid to the NCAA Championship Tournament. The demise of the Robert Morris program after the 2020–21 season reduced CHA's membership to five, one fewer than the six required to qualify for an automatic bid. Under current NCAA rules, any conference with an automatic bid that drops below six members has two years to restore its membership to the required six before losing its automatic bid. This issue became moot when Robert Morris reinstated its program and rejoined CHA effective in 2023–24

ECAC Hockey 
Located in the northeastern United States, the ECAC Hockey has changed to meet the needs of the exploding collegiate sport as 24 teams have called ECAC Hockey home since the first regional championship was contested in 1984. Clarkson became the first non-WCHA team to win the national championship when it defeated the Minnesota Gophers in the 2014 Frozen Four, and has since won titles in 2017 and 2018.

Brown Bears women's ice hockey
Clarkson Golden Knights women's ice hockey
Colgate Raiders women's ice hockey
Cornell Big Red women's ice hockey
Dartmouth Big Green women's ice hockey
Harvard Crimson women's ice hockey
Princeton Tigers women's ice hockey
Quinnipiac Bobcats women's ice hockey
Rensselaer Polytechnic Institute Engineers
St. Lawrence Skating Saints women's ice hockey
Union Dutchwomen ice hockey
Yale Bulldogs women's ice hockey

It is the only NCAA Division I hockey conference whose members all field varsity men's and women's teams.

New England Women's Hockey Alliance (NEWHA) 
The newest conference to receive NCAA Division I recognition in ice hockey is the New England Women's Hockey Alliance. The NEWHA formed in 2017 as a scheduling alliance between the sport's six then-existing National Collegiate (Division I/II) independents, all located in New England. Of these schools, Sacred Heart was the only one that played at the National Collegiate level before 2017, having competed as an independent since 2003. The other five charter members, which all began National Collegiate play in 2017, consisted of one Division I member (Holy Cross) and four Division II members (Franklin Pierce, Post, Saint Anselm, Saint Michael's). Holy Cross left after the first NEWHA season of 2017–18 to join Hockey East. Shortly before the 2018–19 season, the remaining five members formally organized as a conference and began the process of gaining full NCAA recognition.

In the meantime, LIU Brooklyn had announced that it would add women's ice hockey effective in 2019–20, and would join the NEWHA at that time. Shortly after this announcement, the school's parent institution, Long Island University, announced that it would merge the athletic programs of its two main campuses (Division I Brooklyn and Division II Post) into a single Division I program that would later be unveiled as the LIU Sharks.

With the conference membership returning to six for 2019–20, the NCAA officially approved the NEWHA as a Division I conference shortly before the start of that season. This action also meant that there would be no independent programs in that season, since the NEWHA membership included all of the previous National Collegiate independents. The NEWHA received its first automatic NCAA tournament berth in 2021–22. Stonehill had originally planned to begin varsity play in the 2021–22 season as the NEWHA's seventh member, but due to recruiting issues brought on by COVID-19 delayed its debut until 2022–23.

Another D-II school, Assumption, joined the NEWHA for administrative purposes alongside Stonehill in 2022–23, but will not start varsity play until 2023–24.

Assumption Greyhounds women's ice hockey (joining in 2023)
Franklin Pierce Ravens women's ice hockey
LIU Sharks women's ice hockey
Post Eagles women's ice hockey
Sacred Heart Pioneers women's ice hockey
Saint Anselm Hawks women's ice hockey
Saint Michael's Purple Knights women's ice hockey
Stonehill Skyhawks women's ice hockey

Western Collegiate Hockey Association (WCHA) 
The Western Collegiate Hockey Association operates over a wide area of the Midwestern and Western United States. It participates in NCAA Division I as a women's hockey-only conference. Apart from the three titles won by Clarkson, every other National Collegiate women's title has been won by a WCHA team.

Bemidji State Beavers women's ice hockey
Minnesota Golden Gophers women's ice hockey
Minnesota–Duluth Bulldogs women's ice hockey
Minnesota State Mavericks women's ice hockey
Ohio State Buckeyes women's ice hockey
St. Cloud State Huskies women's ice hockey
St. Thomas Tommies women's ice hockey
Wisconsin Badgers women's ice hockey

Although the men's side of the WCHA was heavily affected by conference realignment in 2013, the women's side of the conference remained intact. After seven of the then-current 10 members of the men's WCHA left the conference after the 2020–21 season to reestablish the Central Collegiate Hockey Association, the WCHA disbanded its men's division and now operates as a women-only league.

References

External links
  NCAA Division I women ice hockey page
 NCAA Ice Hockey, Division I Women's Records

con
N
NCAA Division I ice hockey conferences